The fourth season of Shark Tank aired on Network Ten from 15 May 2018. The series was confirmed following the opening of auditions in August 2017.

Summary

The show features a panel of potential investors, named "Sharks", who listen to entrepreneurs pitch ideas for a business or product they wish to develop. These self-made multi-millionaires judge the business concepts and products pitched and then decide whether to invest their own money to help market and mentor each contestant.

Investments by Shark

Episodes

Episode 1

Episode 2

Episode 3

Episode 4

Episode 5

Episode 6

Episode 7

Episode 8

Episode 9

Episode 10

Episode 11

Episode 12

Episode 13

Ratings

References

2018 Australian television seasons